Football Club West Ham United is a Kenyan football club based in Mombasa.

History
At the beginning of the 2012 season, Congo United Football Club signed a one-year partnership deal with the JMJ Academy, and as a result the club was renamed Congo JMJ United Football Club. After the end of the season, no extension of the deal was signed and as a result the club was given its current name, FC West Ham United.

References 

FKF Division One clubs
Football clubs in Kenya